Hürriyet Gücer (born 25 October 1981) is a Turkish former professional footballer. He played as a defensive midfielder.

References

İlhan Parlak Gaziantepspor'da!, olaymedya.com, 7 January 2016

External links

1981 births
Living people
Footballers from Ankara
Turkish footballers
Turkey B international footballers
Turkey youth international footballers
Ankaraspor footballers
MKE Ankaragücü footballers
Gaziantepspor footballers
Eskişehirspor footballers
Süper Lig players
Association football midfielders